"I Need You" is a song by British rock band the Kinks. It was released as a B-Side to "Set Me Free". The song, along with "You Really Got Me" and "All Day and All of the Night", has been cited as one of the influences which shifted the focus from rock 'n' roll to hard-hitting rock music. Never a part of the Kinks live act, it has since been revived live by both Davies brothers solo in the 21st Century.

Personnel 
According to band researcher Doug Hinman:

The Kinks
Ray Davieslead vocal, rhythm guitar
Dave Daviesbacking vocal, lead guitar
Pete Quaifebass
Mick Avorydrums

Additional musician
Rasa Daviesbacking vocal

Notes

References

Sources 

 

1965 songs
The Kinks songs
Songs written by Ray Davies
Pye Records singles
Reprise Records singles